Sympistis shirleyae is a moth of the family Noctuidae first described by James T. Troubridge in 2008. It is found in California.

The wingspan is about 31 mm.

References

shirleyae
Moths of North America
Endemic fauna of California
Moths described in 2008
Fauna without expected TNC conservation status